Donald Victor Dupree, Sr. (February 10, 1919 - May 1, 1993), from Saranac Lake, New York, was an American bobsledder who competed in the late 1940s. He won a bronze medal in the four-man event at the 1948 Winter Olympics in St. Moritz.

Dupree also won a silver medal in the four-man at the 1949 FIBT World Championships in Lake Placid, New York.

References
Bobsleigh four-man Olympic medalists for 1924, 1932-56, and since 1964
Bobsleigh four-man world championship medalists since 1930
DatabaseOlympics.com profile

1919 births
1993 deaths
American male bobsledders
Bobsledders at the 1948 Winter Olympics
Medalists at the 1948 Winter Olympics
People from Saranac Lake, New York
Olympic bronze medalists for the United States in bobsleigh